Sancocho (from the Spanish verb sancochar, "to parboil") is a traditional soup in several Latin American cuisines. Variations represent popular national dishes in Dominican Republic, Colombia, Cuba, Honduras, Ecuador, Panama, Puerto Rico, Trinidad and Tobago, and Venezuela. It usually consists of large pieces of meat, tubers and vegetables served in a broth.

Variations

In Puerto Rico, sancocho is considered a fairly rustic dish. It is made with chicken and smoked ham (sancocho de gallina), top round beef (sancocho), pork feet with chickpeas (sancocho de patitas), beef short ribs with chorizo, or fish, shellfish and salted cod cooked in coconut milk and ginger with rice dumplings (caldo santo). There are several versions and every household has their own take on sancocho, but a true Puerto Rican sancocho always calls for corn on the cob, a variety of tubers, squash, green bananas, and meat. The hearty stew is served with a small bowl of rice, pique criollo, tostones, and bread.

In Venezuela, sancochos are prepared throughout the country, recognized as a typical meal of the weekend. The stew can be beef (usually in the Llanos region), chicken (usually central and western region), beef stomach and shank (simply called "tripe") or goat (here called "goat tripe", typical of western Falcón and Lara states) and fish or seafood (usually East and Caribbean coast). When mixing two types of meat (chicken and beef, etc.) is called crossover or "cruzado". Among vegetables and traditional spices for all varieties are yam, onion, garlic, salt, pepper, oregano, potato, cassava, jojoto (maize/corn), celery (celeriac), taro (mafafa/malanga), pumpkin (squash), cabbage, Chinese taro or Chirel hot pepper, cilantro, and green or topocho banana.

These soups are major Venezuelan cuisine dishes that are not usually accompanied by other foods. Consumed at lunchtime or in the evening, the stew is a common dish at celebrations, usually served during or after meals—the latter, according to popular belief, to relieve hangover. For this reason, it is typical to serve this dish for lunch on Christmas or New Year's Day.

In Trinidad and Tobago, it is known as sancoche or "Saturday soup", because, like the Venezuelan version, it is primarily eaten on the weekend. The fish version of the dish is known as "fish broff". Generally, these are heavily spiced with green seasoning, pimiento (seasoning pepper) and hot pepper (scotch bonnet).

It is usually served with cassava or with arepas. Some people add lemon juice (especially fish). There are variants of the same, such as the cruzado and the three-phase, when three types of meat are combined. The popularity of this dish is seen at celebrations: Instead of saying one is going to a party, it is common to "go to a sancocho." Colloquially, it is often simply called "soup". In some regions (as in Zulia state) it is given the name sopón.

Sancocho is a traditional food in Colombia made with many kinds of meat (most commonly chicken, hen, pork ribs, cow ribs, fish, and ox tail) with large pieces of plantain, potato, cassava and/or other vegetables such as tomato, scallion, cilantro, and mazorca (corn on the cob), depending on the region. Some top it off with fresh cilantro, onion and squeezed lime—a sort of "pico de gallo", minus the tomato. It is also served with a side of sliced avocado and a plate of white rice, which is usually dipped in with each spoonful of soup.

In Ecuador, sancocho is similar to the Colombian version. It has the typical ingredients: yuca, plantain, and corn "choclo". It is usually made with beef but can also be done with hen, chicken, or fish. Fish is particularly used in the coastal regions where peanuts are also added to give their characteristic flavor.

The Peruvian sancocho is called "sancochado" a baseline: meat chunks, corn, rice, and potatoes.

In the Dominican Republic, "sancocho"  is considered one of the national dishes, along with "la bandera" (the flag), consisting of rice, generally red or black beans, some root vegetables and meat. Although, Dominicans usually serve the dish with white rice and avocados. There is a variant called sancocho cruzado or sancocho de siete carnes, which includes chicken, beef and pork, with other meats. Sancocho de siete carnes means "seven meat sancocho" and is considered the ultimate sancocho dish. Longaniza, a type of pork sausage, is also used. Sancocho de gallina (hen sancocho) is common as well, often made for special occasions like holidays or on weekends. While sancocho de habichuela (bean sancocho) and sancocho de guandules are common, other types of sancocho are very rare.

There is a similar dish in Costa Rica: It is called olla de carne (meat pot).

Also known as sancocho de gallina, it is the national dish of Panama. The basic ingredients are chicken, ñame (adding flavor and acting as a thickener, giving it its characteristic texture and brightness), and culantro (giving it most of its characteristic flavor and greenish tone); often yuca, mazorca (corn on the cob) and otoe are added. Other optional ingredients include ñampí (as the Eddoe variety of taro is known), chopped onions, garlic and oregano. It is frequently served with white rice on the side, meant to be either mixed in or eaten with each spoonful. Hot sauce is frequently added, depending on regional and individual preferences. Regional varieties include sancocho chorrerano (a specialty of the town of La Chorrera, which is only made with free-range chicken, onions, garlic, chili peppers, oregano and ñame) and Sancocho chiricano (a specialty from Chiriquí Province and the heartiest variety, containing squash in addition to all basic and optional ingredients mentioned before, having a yellowish color as a result). It is often recommended as the best remedy for a hangover. It is used as a metaphor for the country's racial diversity due to the varied ingredients that contribute their particular properties to and having an equally important role in the cooking process and final product.

In El Salvador, it is a stew made with the offal of cattle, such as the stomach.

Reflecting its Spanish influence, sancocho is eaten in the Philippines, where the hearty stew is made with fish, beef shanks, three kinds of meat, chicken, pork butt, bacon, chorizo de bilbao and morcilla (Spanish blood sausage) as well as yucca, potatoes, cilantro, corn, cabbage, bok choy, carrots and string beans. Known as cocido in the Philippines, it is often confused with puchero Filipino, which may use ham and different sausages.

See also

 List of soups

References

External links

Dominican Bean Sancocho Sancocho de Habichuela
Dominican Sancocho
Sanocho from Antioquia 
Sancocho recipe Take a taste of Canary Islands

Canary Islands cuisine
Colombian soups
Dominican Republic cuisine
Ecuadorian soups
National dishes
Panamanian cuisine
Peruvian soups
Puerto Rican soups
Venezuelan soups